
Cantonese people represent the largest group in Hong Kong. The definition usually includes people whose ancestral homes are in Yue Chinese speaking regions of Guangdong province, specifically the guangfu (廣府) region, although sometimes Sze Yap people, the Hakka people or Teochew people (Chiu Chow/Teochew) may be included. Historic Hong Kong censuses distinguished people of Guangdong origin into Guangzhou and Macau, Sze Yap (Siyi), Chaozhou, and Hainan origins, as well as the Indigenous people of the New Territories.

When the population census was first conducted in 1881, it found only 3668 people, with over 95% percent of the population being from Guangdong Province.

Gregory Guldin describes a "Cantonese chauvinism" where the Cantonese are seen as superior to the other Chinese groups in Hong Kong.

In the first few post-war decades, there was an economic rivalry between the Cantonese and the minority Shanghainese. Cantonese could be said to be less willing to work with the British colonizers in their business dealings, and subsequently were less preferred to become representatives to the Legislative Council.

Statistics

1961 Census data of Cantonese speakers by district

Average: 78.98

Standard Deviation: 14.8

Coefficient of Variation: 0.21

See also

Punti
Indigenous inhabitants of the New Territories

References

Sources

 Topley, Marjorie. Cantonese Society in Hong Kong and Singapore: Gender, Religion, Medicine and Money. Hong Kong, Hong Kong University Press, 2011.

Hong Kong society
Asian diaspora in Hong Kong